The Tuskegee National Forest is a U.S. National Forest located in Macon County, Alabama, just north of Tuskegee and west of Auburn.  The topography is level to moderately sloping, with broad ridges with stream terraces and broad floodplains.

Tuskegee National Forest is the smallest national forest in the U.S. (and one of only six that is contained entirely within a single county), but supports many outdoor activities.

The forest is headquartered in Montgomery, as are all four of Alabama's National Forests. The other National Forests in the state are Conecuh, Talladega and William B. Bankhead. There are local ranger district offices located in Tuskegee.

Outdoor Activities
There are four main hiking trails within the National Forest and three of these are also mountain biking trails.  There are also horse trails, two fish ponds, the Uchee Shooting Range, Tsinia Wildlife Viewing Area,  primitive camping and the Taska Recreation Area.

References

External links 
 
 
 Local group's critical assessment of Forest Management

Protected areas of Macon County, Alabama
National Forests of Alabama
Protected areas established in 1959
1959 establishments in Alabama
Alabama placenames of Native American origin